Joan Bennett (1910–1990) was an American stage, film, and television actress. 

Joan Bennett may also refer to:

 Joan Bennett (model) (born 1964)
 Joan W. Bennett (born 1942), American geneticist 
 Joan Bennett (literary scholar) (1896–1986), also known as Joan Frankau, British literary scholar and critic

See also
 Joan Bennett Kennedy (Virginia Joan Kennedy, née Bennett, born 1936), American socialite, musician, author, and model
 Death of JonBenét Ramsey